The qualification event for the 2009 World Wheelchair Curling Championship took place from November 15 to 20, 2008 in Prague, Czech Republic. The event's two top finishers, Germany and China, both qualified to participate in the 2009 World Wheelchair Curling Championship.

The two qualification spots are determined as follows: After the conclusion of the round robin, the top four teams advance to the playoffs. The playoffs follow the first and second rounds of the page playoff system. In the first round, he first seed playing the second and the third seed playing the fourth. In the final round, the loser of 1 v. 2 plays the winner of 3 vs. 4 in the Second Place Game, like in the semifinal of the page playoff system. However, unlike the page playoff system, the winner of 1 vs. 2 and the loser of 3 vs. 4 do not play. The winner of 1 vs. 2 qualifies to the worlds, while the winner of the second place game also qualifies to the worlds.

Teams

Round robin standings

Results

Draw 1
Saturday, November 15, 9:00

Draw 2
Saturday, November 15, 13:30

Draw 3
Sunday, November 16, 9:00

Draw 4
Sunday, November 16, 13:30

Draw 5
Sunday, November 16, 18:00

Draw 6
Monday, November 17, 9:00

Draw 7
Monday, November 17, 13:30

Draw 8
Monday, November 17, 18:00

Draw 9
Tuesday, November 18, 9:00

Draw 10
Tuesday, November 18, 13:30

Draw 11
Tuesday, November 18, 18:00

Draw 12
Wednesday, November 19, 9:00

Draw 13
Wednesday, November 19, 13:30

Playoffs

1 vs. 2
Thursday, November 20, 11:30

 is qualified to participate in the worlds
 moves to Second Place Game

3 vs. 4
Thursday, November 20, 11:30

 advances to Second Place Game

Second Place Game
Thursday, November 20, 15:30
Loser of 1 vs. 2 plays against Winner of 3 vs. 4 for the second qualification spot.

 qualifies to participate in the worlds

External links

World Wheelchair Curling Championship
2008 in curling
Qualification for curling competitions
International curling competitions hosted by the Czech Republic